Developmental Neurobiology is a monthly peer-reviewed scientific journal covering all aspects of neural development. It was established in 1969 as Journal of Neurobiology, covering all of neuroscience, but when the scope become more specialized, it obtained its current name in 2007. The journal is published by Wiley-Blackwell. The editor-in-chief is Bin Chen (University of California, Santa Cruz) and the associate editors are Song-Hai Shi (Tsinghua University, Beijing, China) and Andreas Prokop (University of Manchester).

Abstracting and indexing 
The journals is abstracted and indexed in:

According to the Journal Citation Reports, the journal has a 2019 impact factor of 3.935.

References

External links 
 

Neuroscience journals
Developmental biology journals
Monthly journals
Publications established in 1969
Wiley-Blackwell academic journals
English-language journals